MATSim (the Multi-Agent Transport Simulation Toolkit) is an open source software development project developing agent-based software modules intended for use with transportation planning models.

History
"The MATSim project started with Kai Nagel, then at ETH Zurich, and his interest in
improving his work with, and for, the TRansportation ANalysis and SIMulation System (TRANSIMS)
project; he also wanted to make the resulting code open-source. After
Kai Nagel’s departure to TU Berlin in 2004, Kay W. Axhausen joined the team, bringing a different approach
and experience."

Areas of Application
MATSim has been applied to various areas: road transport, public transport, freight transport, regional evacuation etc.

References

External links

 http://www.matsim.org/

Models of computation
Complex systems theory
Agent-based model
Traffic simulation